

Shaking the Foundations is the fourth studio album by the Toronto new-wave band Rough Trade. It was released in 1982 and became a hit in Canada in 1983, spending 21 weeks on the charts, peaking at #9 in February, putting it at #1 on the CANCON listing.

The only standard single release from the album was "Crimes of Passion" b/w "Endless Night", which peaked at #18. Both this and the title track were included on the 10-track 1985 greatest hits album Birds of a Feather: The Best of Rough Trade. "I Want to Live" b/w "Numero Fatale" and "The Sacred and the Profane" (the last track being from the previous album For Those Who Think Young) was released as a 12-inch picture sleeve disc.

Reception 

Shaking the Foundations hit gold in Canada four weeks after its release (50,000 units, certified by the CRIA on March 1, 1983), and was the #68 album of the year for 1983. It won the 1983 U-Know Award for Album of the Year.

Track list 

Note that the UK release of Shaking the Foundations adds the track "All Touch" to the album, placing it at the beginning of side two (right before "America: Bad and Beautiful").

Charts

Personnel 
During the recording of this album, Terry Wilkins and Bucky Berger left the band and were replaced by Howard Ayee and Jorn Anderson.

Carole Pope - vocals
Kevan Staples - guitar, keyboards, percussion, piano, synthesizer, vocals
Terry Wilkins - bass
Bucky Berger - drums
Howard Ayee - bass
Jorn Andersen - drums
David McMorrow - synthesizer

Additional vocals
Ray Borg
Bruce Cockburn
Scott Davey
Nona Hendryx
Tevan Kaplan
Sharon Lee Williams

Production 
Gary Gray was nominated for the Recording Engineer of the Year Juno Award for his work on this album.

Gene Martynec - producer
Carole Pope - producer
Kevan Staples - producer, art direction 
Gary Grey - engineer
Peter Lee - assistant engineer
Rick Starks - assistant engineer
George Marino - mastering
Peter J. Moore - remastering, restoration
Bart Schoales - art direction
Christopher Dew - photography

References

External links 
 Amazon.com reviews

1982 albums
Rough Trade (band) albums